The Latin Grammy Award for Best Portuguese Language Rock or Alternative Album is an honor presented annually at the Latin Grammy Awards, a ceremony that recognizes excellence and creates a wider awareness of cultural diversity and contributions of Latin recording artists in the United States and internationally. 

According to the category description guide for the 13th Latin Grammy Awards, the award is for vocal or instrumental Portuguese Language Rock albums containing at least 51% playing time of newly recorded material.  For Solo artists, duos or groups. From 2000 to 2015, the award category was presented as Best Brazilian Rock Album and was changed to its current name in 2016.

Brazilian band Os Paralamas do Sucesso hold the record of most wins in the category with three, followed by Erasmo Carlos with two wins.

Winners and nominees

2000s

2010s

2020s

References

External links
Official site of the Latin Grammy Awards

 
Portuguese Language Rock Album